Surat  is a city in the western Indian state of Gujarat. The word Surat literally means face in Gujarati and Hindi. Located on the banks of the river Tapti near its confluence with the Arabian Sea, it used to be a large seaport. It is now the commercial and economic center in South Gujarat, and one of the largest urban areas of western India. It has well-established diamond and textile industry, and is a major  supply centre for apparels and accessories. About 90% of the world's diamonds supply are cut and polished in the city. It is the second largest city in Gujarat after Ahmedabad and the eighth largest city by population and ninth largest urban agglomeration in India. It is the administrative capital of the Surat district. The city centre is located on the Tapti River, close to Arabian Sea.

Surat will be the world's fastest growing city from 2019 to 2035, according to a study conducted by Economic Times. The city registered an annualised GDP growth rate of 11.5% over the seven fiscal years between 2001 and 2008. Surat was awarded "best city" by the Annual Survey of India's City-Systems (ASICS) in 2013. Surat is selected as the first smart IT city in India which is being constituted by the Microsoft CityNext Initiative tied up with IT services majors Tata Consultancy Services and Wipro. The city has 2.97 million internet users, about 65% of total population. Surat was selected in 2015 for an IBM Smarter Cities Challenge grant. Surat has been selected as one of twenty Indian cities to be developed as a smart city under PM Narendra Modi's flagship Smart Cities Mission.

Surat is listed as the second cleanest city of India as of 21 August 2020 according to the Swachh Survekshan 2020 on 20 August. It suffered a major pipeline fire which caused some damage.

Surat, famous for its diamond cutting and polishing, is known as the Diamond City of India. The city has various engineering plants like Essar, Larsen and Toubro and RIL. Surat won the Netexplo Smart Cities Award 2019 with UNESCO in the resilience category. Surat's mayor will receive the award at the UNESCO House in Paris, France in March next year.

History

Etymology 

Surat was founded by a man called Gopi, who named the area Surajpur or Suryapur. Duarte Barbosa described Surat as Suratt. Jacob Peeters referred to Surat as Sourratte which is a Dutch name. There are many other names of Surat in history. Surat is referred to as Surrat, Surate or Soorat in some literature.

Surat before the Mughal Empire
From 1297, Gujarat was gradually conquered by Allauddin Khilji, the ruler of the principal state in north India at the time, the Delhi Sultanate. The Delhi Sultanate appointed Governors to control Gujarat, but this had to be forcefully imposed, notably in 1347, when Muhammad bin Tughluq sacked Surat, among other cities.

As control from the Delhi Sultanate waned at the end of the 14th century, pressure grew for an independent Gujarat, culminating in the then Governor Zafar Khan declaring independence in 1407. Surat was controlled directly by the nobles of the Rajput kingdom of Baglana who fell either under the Gujarat Sultans or the Deccan sultanates. However, following the fall of the Gujarat Sultanate in 1538 it was controlled by more local nobles starting with Chengiz Khan who enjoyed absolute authority over Surat, Broach, Baroda and Champaner. However, in 1637, Aurangzeb fully annexed Baglana into the Mughal Empire.

In 1514, the Portuguese traveler Duarte Barbosa described Surat as an important seaport, frequented by many ships from Malabar and various parts of the world. By 1520, the name of the city had become Surat. It was burned by the Portuguese (1512 and 1530) and conquered by the Mughals (1573) and was twice raided by the Maratha king Shivaji (17th century).

During the Mughal Empire
It was the most prosperous port in the Mughal empire. Despite being a rich city, Surat looked like a typical "grubby" trader's town with mud-and-bamboo tenements and crooked streets, although along the riverfront there were a few mansions and warehouses belonging to local merchant princes and the establishments of Turkish, Armenian, English, French and Dutch traders. There were also hospitals for cows, horses, flies and insects run by religious Jains, which puzzled travelers. Some streets were narrow while others were of sufficient width. In the evening, especially near the Bazaar (marketplace), the streets became crowded with people and merchants (including Banyan merchants) selling their goods. Surat was a populous city during the Mughal era but also had a large transient population: during the monsoon season, when ships could come and go from the ports without danger, the city's population would swell. In 1612, England established its first Indian trading factory in Surat. The city was looted twice by the Maratha king Shivaji, with the first sacking occurring in 1664. Shivaji's raids scared trade away and caused ruin to the city.

Later, Surat became the emporium of India, exporting gold and cloth. Its major industries were shipbuilding and textile manufacture. The coast of the Tapti River, from Athwalines to Dumas, was specially meant for shipbuilders, who were usually Rassis. The city continued to be prosperous until the rise of Bombay (present-day Mumbai). Afterward, Surat's shipbuilding industry declined and Surat itself gradually declined throughout the 18th century. During 1790–1791, an epidemic killed 100,000 Gujaratis in Surat. The British and Dutch both claimed control of the city, but in 1800, the British took control of Surat.

By the middle of the 19th century, Surat had become a stagnant city with about 80,000 inhabitants. When India's railways opened, the city started becoming prosperous again. Silks, cotton, brocades, and objects of gold and silver from Surat became famous and the ancient art of manufacturing fine muslin was revived.

Modern period

Post Independence 
After India gained independence on 15 August 1947, Surat became part of India. At that time it was a part of Bombay State. Later it became the part of Gujarat state. Along with Mumbai, Ahmedabad, Pune, Nagpur and Vadodara, Surat became one of the fast growing cities and major commercial and industrial centers of Western India. During the post-independence period, Surat has experienced considerable growth in industrial activities especially textiles and chemical along with trading activities. On 2 October 2007 Surat district was split into two by the creation of a new Tapi district, under the Surat District Re-organisation Act 2007.

Geography 

Surat is a port city situated on the banks of the Tapi river. Damming of the Tapi caused the original port facilities to close; the nearest port is now in the Magadalla and Hazira area of Surat Metropolitan Region. It has a famous beach called 'Dumas Beach' located in Hazira.
It has an average elevation of 13 metres. The Surat district is surrounded by the Bharuch, Narmada, Navsari, to the west is the Gulf of Cambay and the surrounding districts. The climate is tropical and monsoon rainfall is abundant (about 2,500 mm a year). According to the Bureau of Indian Standards, the town falls under seismic zone-III, in a scale of I to V (in order of increasing vulnerability to earthquakes).

Climate 
Surat has a tropical savanna climate (Köppen: Aw), moderated strongly by the Sea to the Gulf of Camboy. The summer begins in early March and lasts until June. April and May are the hottest months, the average maximum temperature being . October and November see the retreat of the monsoon and a return of high temperatures until late November.

Since the 20th century, Surat has experienced some 20 floods. In 1968, most parts of the city were flooded and in 1994 a flood caused a country-wide plague outbreak, Surat being the epicenter. In 1998, 30 per cent of Surat had gone under water due to flooding in Tapti river following release of water from Ukai dam located 90 km from Surat and in Aug 2006 flood more than 95 per cent of the city was under Tapti river waters, killing more than 120 people, stranding tens of thousands in their homes without food or electricity and closing businesses and schools for weeks. The city is expected to experience more flooding and extreme weather as climate change becomes worse, so has invested in flood protection and climate resilience infrastructure.

Demographics 

A resident of Surat is called Surati. According to the 2011 India census, the population of Surat is 4,467,797. Surat has an average literacy rate of 89%, higher than the national average of 79.5%, male literacy is 93%, and female literacy is 84%.

Males constitute 53% of the population and females 47%. In Surat, 13% of the population is under 6 years of age.

Politics
Darshana Jardosh, of BJP is the MP from the Surat Lok Sabha constituency.

The Assembly constituencies of Surat district are
  

|}

Civic institutions 

The Surat Municipal Corporation is responsible for maintaining the city's civic infrastructure as well as carrying out associated administrative duties. At present, BJP is the ruling party with a majority. Under the Provisions of Bombay Provincial Municipal Corporations Act, 1949, Section – 4, the powers have been vested in three Distinct Statutory Authorities: the General Board, the Standing Committee, and the Municipal Commissioner. It ranked 7 out of 21 cities for best administrative practices in India in 2014. It scored 3.5 on 10 compared to the national average of 3.3. It is the only city in India to disclose municipal budgets on a weekly basis.

Public Safety 
Surat began the 'Safe City Project' in 2011 aimed at keeping the city safe using surveillance cameras. The project was headed by Sanjay Srivastava (IPS) who was then the Joint-Commissioner of Surat Police. The 280-square-foot video wall claimed to be the largest surveillance screen in the country, is being installed in the control room of Police Commissioner Mr. Rakesh Asthana (IPS). This will help the police view the entire city live through 10,000 CCTV cameras across the city. Surat police have decided to install 5,000 CCTV cameras at sensitive points across the city. While 1,000 cameras will be night vision cameras, 4,000 others will be simple CCTV cameras. This has been installed on PPP base with the help of the city's businessmen, the city's social persons, Surat Municipal Corporation, and the Surat City Police.

Economy 

Surat ranked 9th in India with a GDP of 2.60 lakh crore in fiscal year 2016 ($40 billion in 2016). Surat GDP in 2020 will be around $57 billion estimated by The City Mayors Foundation, an international think tank on urban affairs. Surat is a major hub of diamond cutting and polishing. The first diamond workshops in Gujarat appeared in Surat and Navasari in the late 1950s. The major group working in this industry is people from the Saurashtra region of Gujarat. Because of demand in the American market from the early 1970s to the mid-1980s (with only a brief recession in 1979), Surat's diamond industry grew tremendously. Currently, most of the diamond polishing workshops are running in the Varachha area of Surat, mostly by the people of the Patel community. Around the world, 8 out of 10 diamonds on the market were cut and polished in Surat. This industry earns India about US$10 billion in annual exports. That declined by about 18% in 2019 due to reduced demand for diamonds. The decline continued in 2020 when the industry closed for some months because of the COVID-19 pandemic in India. A legacy of old Dutch trade links, it began after a Surti entrepreneur returned from East Africa bringing diamond cutters. The rough diamonds are mined in South Africa and other regions of the African continent, and go from here as smooth gems to Antwerp, Belgium where the international diamond trade is run mainly by Hasidic Jews and Jains from Palanpur in North Gujarat. Surat's economy drives from a range of manufacturing and industry fields such as diamonds, textiles, petrochemicals, shipbuilding, automobile, port etc.
Since it is known for producing textiles, including silk, Surat is known as the textile hub of the nation or the Silk City of India. It is very famous for its cotton mills and Surat Zari Craft. Surat is the biggest center of MMF (man-made fiber) in India. It has a total of 381 dyeing and printing mills and 41,100 power loom units. There are over a hundred thousand units and mills in total. The overall annual turnover is around 5 billion rupees. There are over 800 cloth wholesalers in Surat. It is the largest manufacturer of clothes in India, and Surti dress material can be found in any state of India. Surat produces 9 million meters of fabric annually, which accounts for 60% of the total polyester cloth production in India. Now the city is focusing on increasing the exports of its textile.

There are many SME Domestic IT Companies present in Surat. MNC IT companies like IBM,  HCL have satellite or virtual branches in Surat. On 14 February 2014, Government of Gujarat DST had handover STPI Surat at Bhestan-Jiav Road, Bhestan Near Udhana-Sachin BRTS Route. Surat city administration will demand for setting up of an information technology (IT) hub and an Indian Institute of Information Technology (IIIT) on the outskirts of the city. Microsoft CityNext initiative has tied up with IT services majors Tata Consultancy Services and Wipro to leverage technology for sustainable growth of cities in India. The first smart IT city in India is being constituted by the Microsoft CityNext Initiative in Surat, Gujarat. In 2011, Surat hosted India's first Microsoft DreamSpark Yatra (a tech event) with speakers from Microsoft Headquarters at Redmond, Washington. The event was organised by Ex-Microsoft Student Partner Samarth Zankharia. In May 2015, Tech giant IBM has chosen Surat among 16 global locations for its smart cities program to help them address challenges like waste management, disaster management and citizen services. Under the program, IBM will send a team of experts to each of the chosen cities where they will spend three weeks working closely with city staff analysing data about critical issues faced by its local bodies; the co-operation continued into 2016.

Surat is being a port city, it has turned as a major commercial and industrial hub in India. It is home for many companies such as Oil and Natural Gas Corporation, Reliance Industries (Hazira Manufacturing Division), Essar Steel, Larsen & Toubro, Krishak Bharati Cooperative, NTPC Limited, Bharat Petroleum, Indian Oil Corporation, UltraTech Cement, Shell, GAIL, GSEG, Gujarat State Petroleum Corporation, Hero MotoCorp etc. Hazira Port is located in Hazira, an industrial suburb where most of the industries are located while other region is Magdalla which is also developed as Port of Magdalla.

The government of Gujarat plans another project near Surat similar to Gujarat International Finance Tec-City (GIFT). The Chief Minister has suggested that the government wishes to develop DREAM to have a five-seven star hotel, bank, IT, corporate trading house, entertainment zone and other facilities while the Surat Diamond Bourse (SDB) will be based there. Allotment of Khajod land for the project is convenient for the state government because they have  of available land. The Trade Centre, located near Sarsana village, will have a  pillar-less air-conditioned hall with a  pillar-less dome.

Transport

Built in 1860, Surat railway station falls under the administrative control of Western Railway zone of the Indian Railways. In early 2016, the Indian Railway Catering and Tourism Corporation rated the facility the best large station in India based on cleanliness.

The Sitilink or Surat BRTS is a bus rapid transit system in the city. Initiated by Bharat Shah, additional city engineer of Surat Municipal Corporation. It is operated by Surat Municipal Corporation and as of August 2017, had a network of 245 buses connecting major localities.

Surat International Airport located in Magdalla, 11 kilometres (7 mi) southwest of Surat. It is the 2nd busiest airport in Gujarat in terms of both aircraft movements and passenger traffic. Currently, airlines such as Air India, Alliance Air, AirAsia India, SpiceJet, IndiGo Airlines, Air Odisha, Ventura AirConnect provide flight services from the Surat to various major cities like New Delhi, Mumbai, Kolkata, Chennai, Bengaluru, Hyderabad, Goa, Jaipur, Visakhapatnam.  There are also running international flights for the Sharjah route of Air India Express. Apart from the main city, Surat Airport also caters to various localities of south Gujarat including Navsari, Bardoli, Valsad, Bharuch, Ankleshwar.

Surat Metro is an under construction rapid transit rail system for the city.

Culture

Food 
Surat is known for its food and has its own list of cherished street foods. There is a famous saying in Gujarati language "સુરતનું જમણ અને કાશીનું મરણ", meaning Eat in Surat and Die in Kashi for the ultimate experience of the soul.

The unique dishes of surat includes Locho, Ghari (sweet), Surti Bhusu, Alupuri, Kavsa, Ponk, Undhiyu, Dhokla, Khaman, Sev Khamani, and so forth.

People's love for food in Surat is so much that there is a lane called as " Khaudra gali" which means foodie's lane which has all stalls of various types of dishes specialty being Mysore Dosa.

Education

Universities 
Sardar Vallabhbhai National Institute of Technology, Surat is one of 31 National Institutes of Technology that are recognised as Institutes of National Importance by the Government of India. Indian Institute of Information Technology, Surat started in 2017.

Most of the regional colleges are affiliated to Veer Narmad South Gujarat University (VNSGU, named after the poet Veer Narmad), which has headquarters in the Surat Metropolitan Region. Colleges are also affiliated to SNDT, Gujarat Technological University and other universities. Government Medical College, Surat is a more than 50 years old medical school of 250 yearly student admission capacity with attached tertiary care hospital, New Civil Hospital. Surat Municipal Institute of Medical Education and Research (SMIMER) is a Municipal Medical College affiliated with the Veer Narmad South Gujarat University. Auro University has also started to provide education in Surat.

Science Center 
 Science Center, Surat is a multi-facility complex built by the Surat Municipal Corporation in 2009, the first of its type in western India. The complex houses a science center, museum, an art gallery, an auditorium, an amphitheater and a planetarium.

Sports

Pandit Dindayal Upadhyay Indoor Stadium 

With a seating capacity of 6800,  Pandit Dindayal Upadhyay Indoor Stadium is the first of its kind in the Western Region of India. The stadium frequently organizes national and international indoor games such as volleyball, table tennis, gymnastics, handball, boxing, wrestling, badminton, basketball, and tennis. It has a central arena of size 63 m x 33 m, rooms for participants and team officials, and other essential facilities including snack bars. This is also a convenient venue for organizing cultural programs, music concerts, drama, fashion shows, seminars, conferences, and many more. The Indoor Stadium also hosted TEDxSurat 2018 on 7 October 2018 which is the largest TEDx conference in Gujarat and one of the largest TEDx conferences in the world.

Lalbhai Contractor Cricket Stadium 
Lalbhai contractor cricket stadium has a capacity of more than 7000 and hosted several Ranji, Irani and Duleep Trophy matches. The stadium also serves as a primary destination for local budding cricketers and enthusiasts. The stadium has hosted several benefit matches for international cricketers as well.

Surat in literature 

 The Coffee-House of Surat - By Leo Tolstoy
 A Voyage to Surat in the Year 1689 - by John Ovington
 Gazetteer of the Bombay Presidency: Gujarát Surat and Broach
 The Land of Malabar - by Duarte Barbosa
 Plague in Surat: Crisis in Urban Governance- By Archana Ghosh & S. Sami Ahmad
 Surat In The Seventeenth Century - by Balkrishna Govind Gokhale
 Surat, Port of the Mughal Empire - by Ruby Maloni
 Surat, Broach and Other Old Cities of Goojerat - by Theodore Hope

Neighborhoods and localities 

Godsamba
Kanpura
Mahuvaria
Mosali
Naldhara

Notable people 

 Abbas–Mustan, Bollywood directors
Hashim Amla, South African Cricketer
 Henry Barnes-Lawrence (1815–1896), Anglican clergyman, and founder of the Association for the Protection of Sea-Birds
 Chahhyaben Bhuva, politician
 Kiransinh Chauhan, Gujarati poet and scriptwriter
 Abdulgani Dahiwala, Gujarati poet
 Ismail Darbar, Bollywood composer
 Freddy Daruwala, Bollywood actor
 Harmeet Desai, table-tennis player
 Prachi Desai, actress in Bollywood
 Savji Dholakia, an Indian businessman. He is the founder and chairman of Hari Krishna Export.
 Pratik Gandhi, Bollywood actor
 Yazdi Karanjia, theatre person - noted as one of the doyens of Parsi theatre
 Sanjeev Kumar (actual name Haribhai Jariwala), film actor
 Mareez, 20th century Gujarati poet, popular for his ghazals
 Narmad, Gujarati poet, playwright, essayist, orator, lexicographer and reformer under the British Raj
 Dhwanil Parekh, 20th century Gujarati poet
 Hardik Pandya, Indian international Cricketer
Laljibhai Patel, an Indian diamantaire and philanthropic social activist, who is the chairman of Dharmanandan Diamonds Pvt. Ltd.(DDPL)
 Hendrik van Rheede (1636–1691), Dutch botanist and colonial administrator. Died of the coast of Mumbai and was buried at the Dutch Cemetery in Surat.
 Mufaddal Saifuddin religious leader of the Dawoodi Bohra
 Gunvant Shah, educationist and columnist
 Bhagwatikumar Sharma, author and journalist
 Farooq Sheikh, actor and television presenter
 Abid Surti, Indian cartoonist and writer
 Mehul Surti, Indian musician
 Mohammed Surti, Indian National Congress politician
 Rusi Surti, Indian cricketer
 Naval Tata, former chairman of Tata Group
 Virji Vora, businessman known as "merchant prince" during Mughal era

See also 

 List of tourist attractions in Surat
 Surat Railway Station
 Surat International Airport
 Surat BRTS
 Surat Metro
 Surat Metropolitan Region

References

External links 

 Website of Surat Municipal Corporation
 Pincode list
 
 

 
Populated coastal places in India
Port cities in India
Port cities and towns of the Arabian Sea
Cities and towns in Surat district
Smart cities in India
Former capital cities in India
Gulf of Khambhat
Metropolitan cities in India
1612 establishments in the British Empire
Populated places established in the 2nd millennium